Tim Jerat (born 5 March 1982) is a German retired footballer. He is the son of the football coach Wolfgang Jerat.

References

External links

Tim Jerat at Kicker

1982 births
Living people
German footballers
Bayer 04 Leverkusen II players
SG Wattenscheid 09 players
1. FSV Mainz 05 II players
KFC Uerdingen 05 players
Wuppertaler SV players
Holstein Kiel players
SpVgg Unterhaching players
Arminia Bielefeld players
Alemannia Aachen players
2. Bundesliga players
3. Liga players
Regionalliga players
Association football midfielders
Footballers from Cologne